Edwina D. Dunn, OBE (born May 29, 1958) is an English entrepreneur in the field of data science and customer-centric business strategy. Since 2014, she has been the Chief Executive Officer of the consumer insights company, Starcount. She is also the founder of The Female Lead campaign. At the end of 2018, she was appointed to the board of Government Centre for Data Ethics & Innovation.

Early life and education 
Dunn was born in Buxton, Derbyshire. She spent her first three years in Rio de Janeiro, Brazil where her father, a former Spitfire pilot, was working as a chartered electrical engineer on a power station project.

After the family returned to the U.K., Dunn won a scholarship to Surbiton High School. She attended Bournemouth University, graduating in 1979 with a B.A. in Geography.

Career 
In 1980, Dunn joined the London division of the American data analysis software consultants, CACI, as a marketing assistant where she became the company’s youngest ever vice-president.

In 1989, Dunn left CACI to become joint founder and CEO of global consumer insights business dunnhumby with her husband and long-term business partner Clive Humby. The company applied science and technology to customer data to help businesses understand consumer trends and behaviors.  From their relationship with Tesco, they launched the Clubcard in 1995 - the first mass customization loyalty program in the world. Dunnhumby has offices in 25 countries employing 1500 people.

Dunn and Humby sold their final stake to Tesco in 2011. Dunn then took some time out to create and develop “The Old Rectory Gardens at Doynton” book. She also instigated the What I See project, a global collection of women’s voices based around 1500 individuals as they reflect on how they perceive themselves. This later became The Female Lead campaign.

In 2012, Dunn and Humby set up H&D Ventures, a business and data science team exploring the possibilities of telecoms and financial services data. In addition, in 2013 Dunn & Humby acquired Purple Seven, a UK theatre and arts analytics company.

Since November 2018 Dunn has been a member of the Centre for Data Ethics and Innovation’s Board and was appointed as Deputy Chair in November 2020. She also sits on the Board of the Geospatial Commission, an expert committee that advises the government of the United Kingdom on the most productive and economically valuable uses of geospatial data.

Leadership style 
Dunn espouses The Power of Two leadership principle, which teaches that the most effective way to operate is by pairing two people with complementary skills e.g. analysts and marketers.

Philanthropy 
Dunn has been a trustee of the Science Museum Foundation since 2013. She was an NED of HMRC from 2013 to 2016, and University Technical Colleges with Lord Kenneth Baker from 2015 to 2017.

From 2014 to 2017, Dunn was chair of the government-backed, private sector-sponsored Your Life campaign, which sought to promote STEM subjects (Science, Technology, Engineering and Maths) to 14-16 year old students across the UK. It involved the creation of Future Finder, a careers advice app.

Dunn is the founder of The Female Lead, a non-profit organization dedicated to offering women alternative role models to those presented by popular culture. It provides a platform for sharing inspirational stories and films. The accompanying book, The Female Lead: Women Who Shape Our World, was published by Penguin Random House in February 2017. It is being donated to 18,000 schools across the UK and USA, to inspire the next generation of female leaders. In 2020 Dunn bought the autograph suit of Sandy Powell at auction; she then donated it on behalf of The Female Lead to the Theatre and Performance Collection of the Victoria and Albert Museum (V&A) in London.

Awards and honors 
Dunn was awarded an OBE in the 2019 Queens Birthday Honors for Services to Data and Business in the UK.

In 2018, Dunn received the Fashion 4 Development Award for Women’s Empowerment in New York.

She holds four Honorary Doctorates: one in Business Administration from Derby University, and one in Science from Middlesex University, Kingston and Bournemouth.

She also holds three Honorary Fellowships: at Lucy Cavendish College, Cambridge, the Institute of Direct & Digital Marketing, and the Market Research Society, of which she is also Patron.

References 

1958 births
People from Buxton
English businesspeople
Living people
People educated at Surbiton High School